Adela Vinczeová (born 12 October 1980) is a Slovak radio and television presenter. She has presented television shows such as Česko Slovenská SuperStar 2009, the Anděl Awards and the Czech Lion Awards. She is a daughter of Slovak writer, agent of communist secret service (known as agent Lotos) and politician Jozef Banáš. She grew up in Eastern Germany together with her sister Maria. Living abroad helped her gain various language skills and experiences, however, as she always claims, she has been dedicated to her homeland, Slovakia.  In 2015, Banášová won her ninth title at the OTO Awards, making her the most successful person in the ceremony's history.

References

External links

1980 births
Living people
People from Bratislava
Slovak television presenters
Slovak women television presenters